Jason Chen may refer to:

 Jason Chen (businessman), CEO of Acer Inc.
 Jason Chen (singer), Taiwanese-American pop singer

See also
 Jason Chan (disambiguation)